Coed Poeth railway station was a station in Coedpoeth, Wrexham, Wales. The station was opened on 15 November 1897, closed to passengers on 1 January 1931 and closed completely on 2 November 1964.

References

Disused railway stations in Wrexham County Borough
Railway stations in Great Britain opened in 1897
Railway stations in Great Britain closed in 1931
1897 establishments in Wales
1931 disestablishments in Wales
Former Great Western Railway stations